HipNav was the first computer-assisted surgery system developed to guide the surgeon during total hip replacement surgery.  It was developed at Carnegie Mellon University.

References

Health care software